Edward Virginius Valentine (November 12, 1838 - October 19, 1930) was an American sculptor born in Richmond, Virginia. He studied in Europe—in Paris with Thomas Couture and François Jouffroy, in Italy under Bonanti, and with August Kiss in Berlin. He briefly headed the Valentine Richmond History Center, which was founded by his brother, Mann S. Valentine Jr. The Wickham-Valentine House, part of the Valentine Museum in Richmond is on the National Register of Historic Places and was named for him and his brother. He died on October 19, 1930, in Richmond, Virginia.

Works 
 Recumbent Lee, marble, Lexington, Virginia, 1875
 Stonewall Jackson Monument, bronze. Lexington Virginia,  1891
 Matthew Fontaine Maury bronze, 1869
 Statue of Williams Carter Wickham, bronze. Monroe Park, Richmond, Virginia,  1891, toppled June 2020
 General Hugh Mercer Monument, Washington Avenue Historic District, 1906
 Robert E. Lee, Virginia Museum of History & Culture of the Virginia Historical Society, Richmond, Virginia,  1909, removed from the United States Capitol, Washington D.C. December 2020
 Thomas Jefferson, marble, Jefferson Hotel, Richmond, Virginia,  1894
 Jefferson Davis Memorial, bronze, Richmond, Virginia, 1907,  and New Orleans,  Louisiana,  1911
 John James Audubon, bronze, New Orleans, Louisiana,  1910

References 

Cocke, Edward J., ''Monumental New Orleans, LaFayette Publishers, New Orleans, 1968
Opitz, Glenn B, Editor, Mantle Fielding's Dictionary of American Painters, Sculptors & Engravers, Apollo Book, Poughkeepsie, NY, 1986
Edward Virginius Valentine Sculpture Studio Timeline

External links 

19th-century American sculptors
American male sculptors
1838 births
1930 deaths
Artists from Richmond, Virginia
Sculptors from Virginia
20th-century American sculptors
20th-century American male artists
19th-century American male artists